Vlastimil Dostálek (born August 23, 1994) is a Czech professional ice hockey player. He is currently playing for HC ZUBR Přerov of the Czech 1.liga.

Dostálek made his Czech Extraliga debut playing with HC Kometa Brno during the 2015-16 Czech Extraliga season.

References

External links

1994 births
Living people
HC Kometa Brno players
HC ZUBR Přerov players
HC Olomouc players
Czech ice hockey forwards
Sportspeople from Přerov
HC Frýdek-Místek players
AZ Havířov players
VHK Vsetín players
HC Dukla Jihlava players
Motor České Budějovice players
HC Slovan Ústečtí Lvi players